Shahnaz Habib is an Indian essayist, fiction writer, travel writer, and translator based in the United States of America. She teaches writing at Bay Path University and The New School, and works as a consultant for the United Nations. In 2018, she received the JCB Prize for Literature.

Biography
Habib grew up in Kerala, South India and is currently based in Brooklyn, New York. Her poem Of Hypocrisy and Cheekbones won the First Prize in the Ninth National Poetry Competition in 2000 organized by The Poetry Society (India) in collaboration with British Council. Her short story "Something Special About Sayyida" was selected for the anthology 21 under 40. Her essays, travel writing, and criticism have appeared in The Guardian, The New Yorker, Afar, the anthology Twentysomething Essays by Twentysomething Writers, and many other publications. Her work has twice been named to the Notable Essays and Literary Nonfiction list by the Best American Essays series.

Awards
Her English translation of the novel Jasmine Days, from the Malayalam original by the author Benyamin, won the 2018 JCB Prize for Literature, which each year recognizes a distinguished work of fiction by an Indian writer working in English or translated fiction by an Indian writer.

See also

 Indian English literature
 Indian poetry
 The Poetry Society (India)

Notes

External links
PaperPlanes (22/02/2019), Interview : Conversations with men and women of wit, humour and letters
 “Poetry Splash” – Select Indian poems
 “Apropos of Nothing” – Shahnaz Habib in The New Yorker

American women writers of Indian descent
English-language poets from India
Year of birth missing (living people)
Living people
21st-century American women writers
Writers from Brooklyn
All India Poetry Prize